Lawrence Hill is a northern suburb of Bracknell in the English county of Berkshire. It stands within the civil parish of Warfield.

Populated places in Berkshire
Bracknell
Warfield